Kiakshuk (1886 – May 3, 1966) was a Canadian Inuit artist who worked both in sculpture and printmaking. Kiakshuk began printmaking in his seventies and, is most commonly praised for creating “real Eskimo pictures” that relate traditional Inuit life and mythology.

Personal life

Kiakshuk was born in 1886 in the north of Baffin Island in Nunavut and moved with his family to the south of Baffin Island to Cape Dorset around 1900. Prior to creating artwork, he earned his living as a hunter.

In 1920, Kiakshuk had a dispute with Ohotok, the husband of both of his sisters Ekateelik and Napatchies. Ohotok promised Kiakshuk the hand of his own sister, Mary, but since Mary was already married to another man named Napatchie Ottochie, the agreement fell apart. When Napatchie died in a hunting accident, there was a rumor that Kiakshuk, a shaman, had caused his death.

In 1958, Kiakshuk appeared in the film The Living Stone, produced by the National Film Board of Canada. In the film he tells Inuit folk tales, sings traditional songs, and discusses the importance of sculpture to a group of children.

Multiple members of Kiakshuk’s family also became visual artists, including his son Lukta Qiatsuq, daughters Ishuhungitok Pootoogook and Paunichea, and his cousin Pitseolak Ashoona.

Artistic career

Kiakshuk learned printmaking from James Houston, an artist who was hired by Canadian federal government to develop Inuit art and craft production in the far North. Houston was working in the South Baffin Island region, Kiakshuk’s home, beginning in 1956. Houston established an artistic co-operative in Cape Dorset in order to encourage Inuit art. After traveling to Japan in 1958 to study with Sosaku-hanga movement artists, including Un’ichi Hiratsuka, Houston brought back printmaking techniques to the co-operative. Since wood is rare in Cape Dorset, many of the Japanese printmaking techniques Houston taught to Inuit artists had to be adapted to local materials, leading Kiakshuk and other artists to practice stonecut printmaking. Unlike traditional Japanese woodcut prints, Inuit artists tend to carve just one block for printing and apply all colors to the same block.

Kiakshuk’s subject matter typically involved stories of Inuit religion and scenes of daily life.

In 1963 Kiakshuk produced three inukshuks, or monumental stone sculptures, for Toronto's Pearson International Airport. The sculptures were reinstalled in 2002 and are the subject of ongoing disagreement as recently as 2017 as some Inuit activists believe the sculptures were installed in a disrespectful manner.

Kiakshuk also sold his drawings and prints for use in book publication, such as Eskimo Songs and Stories, published 1974.

In 1979 one of Kiakshuk’s prints was featured on a Canadian postage stamp.

American rock band DIIV used Kiakshuk's artwork on the cover of their 2012 album Oshin.

Exhibitions
 Ten Years of Eskimo Prints and Recent Sculptures - National Gallery of Canada, 1967
 Strange Scenes—Early Cape Dorset Drawings - McMichael Canadian Art Collection, 1993
 Classic Prints from Cape Dorset: 1960-1972 - Alberts Gallery of Inuit Art, 2003
 Then and Now: Inuit Prints from 1962-2002 - Inuit Gallery of Vancouver, 2003
 Kiakshuk: Images by a Hunter-Artist - National Gallery of Canada, 2001-2002

Collections
 Agnes Etherington Art Centre
British Museum
 Fine Arts Museum of San Francisco
 McMaster Museum of Art, McMaster University
 Metropolitan Museum of Art
 Museum of Anthropology, University of British Columbia
Museum London
 National Gallery of Canada
 National Museum of the American Indian
 Pennsylvania Academy of the Fine Arts
 San Juan Islands Museum of Art
University of Michigan Museum of Art
Whyte Museum of the Canadian Rockies

Publications
 Eskimo Prints - James A. Houston, 1967
 The Art of Qaqaq Ashoona - Christine Lalonde, 1996
 Kiakshuk: Images by a Hunter-Artist - IAQ, 2001
 An Annotated Bibliography of Inuit Art - Richard C. Crandall and Susan M. Crandall, 2005

References

Further reading
 CBC News. “Inukshuk Art at Toronto’s Pearson Airport Angers Some Inuit in Nunavut.” CBC News, September 27, 2017. https://www.cbc.ca/news/canada/north/inukshuks-toronto-pearson-irniq-1.4308698.
 Crandall, Richard C. Inuit Art: A History. Jefferson, North Carolina: McFarland & Company, Inc. Publishers, 2000.
 Fulford, Robert. An Introduction to The Arts in Canada. Toronto: Copp Clark Publishing, 1977.
 Hessel, Ingo. Inuit Art: An Introduction. New York: Harry N. Abrams, 1998.
 Inuit Art Quarterly. “Kiakshuk | Inuit Art Foundation | Artist Database.” Accessed March 27, 2020. https://www.inuitartfoundation.org/iad/artist/Kiakshuk-.
 Lutz, Maija M. Hunters, Carvers & Collectors: The Chauncey C. Nash Collection of Inuit Art. Cambridge, Massachusetts: Peabody Museum Press, 2012.
 Morrison, Philip, and Phylis Morrison. “Books: An Annual Review of Children’s Books for the Christmas Season.” Scientific American 231, no. 6 (December 1974): 144–61.
 Newlands, Anne. Canadian Art: From Its Beginnings to 2000. Ontario: Firefly Books, 2000.
 Pisteolak, Peter. People from Our Side: A Life Story. Edited by Dorothy Harley Eber. Montreal: McGill-Queen’s University Press, 1993.
 Thompson, Courtney R. “Inuit Prints, Japanese Inspiration: Early Printmaking in the Canadian Arctic.” Art in Print 2, no. 3 (October 2012): 32–34.

Inuit sculptors
Inuit from Nunavut
1886 births
1966 deaths
20th-century Canadian sculptors
Artists from Nunavut
Canadian printmakers
20th-century printmakers
Inuit printmakers
Canadian male sculptors
20th-century Canadian printmakers
20th-century Canadian male artists